Kaulitz is a German surname. Notable people with the surname include:

 Bill Kaulitz (born 1989), German singer, member of Tokio Hotel
 Tom Kaulitz (born 1989), German guitarist, member of Tokio Hotel

German-language surnames
Surnames of German origin